William H. Adams may refer to:

 Billy Adams (politician) (William Herbert Adams, 1861–1954), governor of Colorado
 William H. Adams (Virginia politician) (1872–1958)
 William Henry Adams (1809–1865), British politician, lawyer and colonial judge